The 1983–84 St. Francis Terriers men's basketball team represented St. Francis College during the 1983–84 NCAA Division I men's basketball season. The team was coached by Gene Roberti, who was in his fifth year at the helm of the St. Francis Terriers. The Terrier's home games were played at the  Generoso Pope Athletic Complex. The team has been a member of the Northeast Conference since 1981, although at this time the conference was known as the ECAC Metro Conference.

The Terriers finished their season at 2–26 overall and 1–15 in conference play. During the regular season they lost 7 games by 2 points or less. The Terriers played in the conference tournament with the 8th seed, but lost in the opening round to LIU Brooklyn 62–67. At the end of the season, it was announced that Robert Jackson won a share the ECAC Metro Conference Player of the Year Award, along with Carey Scurry of LIU Brooklyn and Chipper Harris of Robert Morris.

This marked an all-time low record for the program and would stand until the 1993–94 season when the Terriers under Ron Ganulin went 1–26 overall and 1–17 in conference play. After the season, Gene Roberti was fired as the head coach, and was replaced by Bob Valvano.

Roster

Schedule and results

|-
!colspan=12 style="background:#0038A8; border: 2px solid #CE1126;;color:#FFFFFF;"| Regular season
 

  

 

  

|-
!colspan=12 style="background:#0038A8; border: 2px solid #CE1126;;color:#FFFFFF;"| ECAC Metro tournament

source

References

St. Francis Brooklyn Terriers men's basketball seasons
St. Francis
St. Francis Brooklyn Terriers men's basketball
St. Francis Brooklyn Terriers men's basketball